Cantuzumab ravtansine (huC242-SPDB-DM4) is an antibody-drug conjugate designed for the treatment of cancers. The humanized monoclonal antibody cantuzumab (huC242) is linked to a cytotoxic agent, ravtansine (DM4). It uses a more hindered disulfide linkage than cantuzumab mertansine.

See also 
 Cantuzumab mertansine
 ImmunoGen Inc, developer of DM4 based drugs

References 

Immunology
Monoclonal antibodies
Antibody-drug conjugates